Merléac is a commune in the Côtes-d'Armor department of Brittany in northwestern France.

Population

Inhabitants of Merléac are called merléaciens in French.

Sights
The Saint-Jacques chapel in the hamlet of Saint-Léon, which is located on the territory of the commune of Merléac, was declared a historic site on December 1, 1908.

See also
Communes of the Côtes-d'Armor department

References

External links

Webpage about cultural heritage 

Communes of Côtes-d'Armor